The Book Thief is a historical fiction novel by the Australian author Markus Zusak, set in Nazi Germany during World War II. Published in 2005, The Book Thief became an international bestseller and was translated into 63 languages and sold 16 million copies. It was adapted into the 2013 feature film, The Book Thief.

The novel follows the adventures of young Liesel Meminger. By personifying "Death" as a tangible being who narrates the story, the novel presents a unique perspective into the world of the victims of the war. There are many tangible themes throughout the entire story.

Plot

Narrated by Death, the story follows Liesel Meminger, a young girl living with foster parents, Hans and Rosa Hubermann, in Nazi Germany during World War II. While adapting to her new home, she is exposed to the horrors of the war and politics. As the political situation in Germany deteriorates, her foster parents conceal a Jewish man named Max Vandenburg. Hans develops a close relationship with Liesel, helping her learn to read and write. Recognizing the power of writing and sharing the written word, Liesel not only begins to steal books that the politicians are seeking to destroy, but also writes her own story, and shares the power of language with Max. By collecting laundry for her foster mother, she also begins a relationship with the mayor's wife, Ilsa Hermann, who allows her to read books in her library.

Hans brings suspicion on his household that he might be a sympathizer with political adversaries of Germany in the war. Max leaves the Hubermanns' home soon after out of fear that the suspicion could endanger him or the family. With death forever circling, bombs fall on Liesel's street, killing her friends, family, and neighbors. Liesel, working on her manuscript in the basement at the time of the raid, is the sole survivor. 

Many years later, or in the words of Death, "just yesterday", Liesel dies as an old woman in the suburbs of Sydney, Australia, with a family and many friends, though she has never forgotten Hans, Rosa, Max, her friend Rudy, and her brother. When Death collects Liesel's soul, he gives her the manuscript she lost in the bombing. She asks him if he read it and Death says, "Yes." She asks him if he understood it, but Death is unable to understand the duality of humanity. Death's last words are for both Liesel and the reader: "I am haunted by humans."

Characters
Death
Death, the collector of souls, known as a negative character black and mystury formed,  arrayed in any or all the world's colors when it comes, narrates the story of a young girl coming of age during the horrific times of Nazi Germany and the Second World War. To the reader, Death insists that it "most definitely can be cheerful", even affable, but also relates that it most certainly cannot be nice. And sometimes Death is "compelled" to take action in sympathy with the human story.

Liesel Meminger
The protagonist of the story is an adopted girl on the verge of adolescence, with blonde hair. Her eyes, however, are brown. She is fostered by the Hubermanns after her biological father "abandons" their family due to being a Communist, her brother dies, and her mother is forced to send her to a foster home to avoid Nazi persecution.  Liesel is the "book thief" referred to in the title because Liesel is fascinated by the power of words. Liesel stole books from a gravedigger, a bonfire, and the mayor's wife, Ilsa Hermann.

Hans Hubermann (Papa)
Liesel's foster father and husband of Rosa, Hans is a former German soldier during the First World War, accordion player, and painter. He develops a close and loving relationship with Liesel and becomes the main source of strength and support for her. He, like Liesel, doesn't have much experience with reading. Together, the two help each other with reading and write all the words they learn on a wall in the basement. He helps Max because Max's father saved Hans in the First World War.

Rosa Hubermann (Mama)
Rosa is Liesel's sharp-tongued foster mother. She has a "wardrobe" build and a displeased face, brown-grey tightly-cinched hair often tied up in a bun and "chlorinated" eyes. Despite her temper, she is a loving wife to Hans and mother to Liesel. To supplement the household income, she does washing and ironing for five of the wealthier households in Molching. When she was introduced to Max the reader sees her soft side.

Rudy Steiner
Liesel's neighbor, Rudy, has bony legs, blue eyes, lemon-colored hair, and a penchant for getting in the middle of situations when he shouldn't. Despite having the appearance of an archetypal German, he does not directly support the Nazis. As a member of a relatively poor household with six children, Rudy is habitually hungry. He is known throughout the neighborhood because of the "Jesse Owens incident", in which he colored himself black with charcoal one night and ran one hundred meters at the local sports field. He is academically and athletically gifted, which attracts the attention of Nazi Party officials, leading to attempted recruitment. His lack of support for the Nazi party becomes problematic as the story progresses. Rudy becomes Liesel's best friend and later falls in love with her. He dies, and Liesel didn't get to  confess her love for him, and she kisses him while he is dead.

Max Vandenburg
A Jewish fist-fighter who takes refuge from the Nazi regime in the Hubermanns’ basement. He is the son of a First World War German soldier who fought alongside Hans Hubermann, and the two developed a close friendship during the war. He has brown, feather-like hair and swampy brown eyes.  During the Nazi reign of terror, Hans agrees to shelter Max and hide him from the Nazi party. During his stay at the Hubermanns' house, Max befriends Liesel, and they share an affinity for words. He writes two books for her and presents her with a sketchbook that contains his life story, which helps Liesel to develop as a writer and reader, which, in turn, saves her life from the bombs falling on her.

Ilsa Hermann
The wife of the mayor of Molching who employs Rosa Hubermann. She fell into a state of depression after the death of her only son, Johann, in the Great War. Ilsa allows Liesel to visit, read, and steal books from her personal library. She also gives Liesel a little black book, which leads Liesel to write her own story, "The Book Thief".

Werner Meminger
Liesel's little brother, who died suddenly on the train with his mother and sister, was buried in a cemetery near the train tracks. His death is what allowed the first book to be stolen, a gravedigger's manual dropped by a young boy learning to work in the cemetery. He died by coughing blood, corroded brown in color.

Paula Meminger (Liesel's mother)
Liesel's mother is only mentioned in the story a few times. Liesel's father was taken away by the Nazis before the novel started because he was a Communist, and the reason her mother – Paula Meminger – was taking both her children to foster care was to save them from Nazi persecution. For a while, Liesel writes letters to her mother thinking there is a chance she is still alive. Like Liesel's father, Liesel's mother dies, but Liesel eventually does realize her mother gave her away to protect her.

Hans Jr (Hans' and Rosa's son)  
Hans Jr is the son of Hans and Rosa Huberman. He is very supportive of the Nazi party and fights with his father about it frequently. He is eventually sent to participate in the Battle of Stalingrad.

Themes

Mortality
The book is introduced by the character/narrator Death, which underlines that mortality is very present in the lives of each character. Throughout the novel, the deaths of prominent characters reaffirm the presence of mortality. Because the novel takes place during the Second World War, death and genocide are nearly omnipresent in the novel.

Death is presented in a manner that is less distant and threatening. Because Death narrates and explains the reasons behind each character's destruction and explains how he feels that he must take the life of each character, Death is given a sense of care rather than fear. At one point, Death states "even death has a heart," which reaffirms that there is a care present in the concept of death and dying.

Language, reading and writing
Throughout the novel, language, reading, and writing are presented as symbolic elements of expression and freedom. They provide identity and personal liberation to those characters who have, or who gain, the power of literacy: "the true power of words". And they provide a framework for Liesel's coming of age. At the beginning of the story shortly after her brother's funeral, Liesel finds a book in the snow, one she is unable to read. Under tutelage by her foster father Hans, she slowly learns to read and write. By the end of the novel, her character arc is largely defined by her progress in reading and writing. The development of Liesel's literacy mirrors her physical growth and maturing over the course of the story.

Literacy skills and vernacular speech also serve as social markers. Wealthy citizens in the story are often portrayed as literate, as owning books and even their own libraries, while the poor are illiterate and do not own books. Rosa Huberman's abrasive and oft-times scatological speech towards her family and others is emblematic of the despairing lives of the poorer classes.

The Nazi burning of books in the story represents evil incarnate. Symbolically, Liesel's repeated rescues of books from Nazi bonfires represent her reclaiming of freedom and her resistance to being controlled by the all-pervasive state.

Love
In the midst of war and loss, love is a central theme which acts as a catalyst for change and sacrifice throughout the book. Liesel overcomes her traumas by learning to love and be loved by her foster family and her friends. At the beginning of the novel, Liesel is traumatized not only by the death of her brother and her separation from her only family but also by the larger issues of war-torn Germany and the destruction wrought by the Nazi party. As Liesel's foster father Hans develops a relationship with her, this relationship helps create healing and growth. This pattern is reflected in the relational dynamic between the Hubermann family and Max. In a society ruled by governmental policies that presume to stand in judgment of who is truly human, the Hubermanns' relationship with Max defies the Nazi regime. Further, the love that Max and Liesel develop through their friendship creates a strong contrast to the fascist hate in the backdrop of the story.

The theme of love also intertwines with the themes of identity and language/reading because all of these themes have the purpose of providing freedom and power in the midst of chaos and control. Liesel's final words in her own written story are "I have hated the words and I have loved them, and I hope I have made them right." She has the power to show her love on paper.

Recognition
 2006: Commonwealth Writers' Prize for Best Book (South East Asia & South Pacific)
 2006: School Library Journal Best Book of the Year
 2006: Daniel Elliott Peace Award
 2006: Publishers Weekly Best Children's Book of the Year
 2006: National Jewish Book Award for Children's and Young Adult Literature
 2006: Bulletin Blue Ribbon Book
 2007: Michael L. Printz Honor Book. The Printz award is given to the best book for teenagers, based only on the quality of the writing.
 2007: Book Sense Book of the Year Award for Children's Literature
 2007: Sydney Taylor Book Award for the best in Jewish children's and YA literature
2007: Best Books for Young Adults (American Library club)

Film adaptation

A film adaptation was released on 8 November 2013. It was directed by Brian Percival. Michael Petroni wrote the script. It stars Geoffrey Rush and Emily Watson as Hans and Rosa Hubermann, Ben Schnetzer as Max Vandenburg, Nico Liersch as Rudy Steiner, and Sophie Nélisse as Liesel Meminger. John Williams wrote the music soundtrack. Much of the movie was filmed in Görlitz, Germany.

Musical adaptation

A musical theater version premiered at the Octagon Theatre in Bolton, Greater Manchester, England, on 17 September 2022. The libretto was written by Jodi Picoult and Timothy Allen McDonald, with music and lyrics by Elyssa Samsel and Kate Anderson. Directed by Lotte Wakeham.

References

External links
 The Book Thief on Fantastic Fiction
 The Book Thief study guide, quotes, themes, literary devices, teacher resources
 
 
 John Patterson, Who exactly is The Book Thief aimed at? The Guardian, 10 February 2014

2005 Australian novels
 Novels by Markus Zusak
 Novels set during World War II
Novels about personifications of death
 Novels about Nazi Germany
 Works about reading
 Australian novels adapted into films
Books about censorship
 Novels about death
 Novels set in Germany
 Novels about the Holocaust
 Cultural depictions of Jesse Owens